Pipili (Sl. No.: 110) is a Vidhan Sabha constituency of Puri district, Odisha.

This constituency includes Pipili, Pipili block and Delanga block.

Elected Members

Fourteen elections were held between 1951 and 2009.
Elected members from the Pipili constituency are:
 
2021: (ByPoll): Rudra Pratap Maharathy (BJD)
2019: (110): Pradeep Maharathy (BJD)
2014: (110): Pradeep Maharathy (BJD)
2009: (110): Pradeep Maharathy (BJD)
2004: (52): Pradeep Maharathy (BJD)
2000: (52): Pradeep Maharathy (BJD)
1995: (52): Yudhistir Samantray (Congress)
1990: (52): Pradeep Maharathy (Janata Dal)
1985: (52): Pradeep Maharathy (Janata Party)
1980: (52): Bipin Bihari Das (Congress-I)
1977: (52): Kiran Lekha Mohanty (Janata Party)
1974: (52): Bipin Bihari Dash (Congress)
1971: (48): Abhimanyu Ran Singh (Congress)
1967: (48): Banamali Patnaik (Jana Congress)
1961: (93): Ramchandra Patnaik (Congress)
1957: (65): Gopinath Bhoi (Congress)
1951: (85): Jayakrushna Mohanty (Congress)

Election Results

2021 By-election

2019 Election Result

2014 Election Result

2009 Election Results
In 2009 election, Biju Janata Dal candidate Pradeep Maharathy defeated Indian National Congress candidate Judhistir Samantaray by a margin of 12,505 votes.

Notes

References

Assembly constituencies of Odisha
Puri district